The Rimberg is a mountain in Hesse, Germany; at 497.1 meter high, in the Gladenbach Uplands, in the Marburg-Biedenkopf district.
On top of it is the Rimbergturm, an observation tower.

The Rimberg's north-easterly neighbour is the Feiselberg, which merges to the valley of the Lahn near Caldern.

External links 
 Images of the Rimberg at Commons

References 

Mountains of Hesse
Hills of the Gladenbach Uplands